The 1996 Baltimore Orioles season in which the Orioles finishing 2nd in the American League East with a record of 88 wins and 74 losses and qualifying for the post-season as the Wild Card team. The Orioles broke the all-time record for most home runs hit by a team (set at 240 by the 1961 New York Yankees) with 257. During the season, four Orioles scored at least 100 runs, four drove in at least 100 runs and seven hit at least 20 home runs. The Orioles pitching staff allowed 209 home runs, 1,604 hits and had an ERA of 5.15. The Orioles defeated the Cleveland Indians in the ALDS and then lost in the ALCS to the New York Yankees.

Offseason

November 22, 1995: Clay Bellinger was signed as a free agent with the Baltimore Orioles.
December 14, 1995: Randy Myers signed as a free agent with the Baltimore Orioles.
December 20, 1995: B. J. Surhoff was signed as a free agent with the Baltimore Orioles.
December 23, 1995: Billy Ripken was signed as a free agent with the Baltimore Orioles.
March 13, 1996: Sherman Obando was traded by the Baltimore Orioles to the Montreal Expos for Tony Tarasco.

Regular season
 On September 27 in Toronto, Roberto Alomar spat at home-plate umpire John Hirschbeck after getting thrown out of a game for arguing a called third strike.

Opening Day starters
Roberto Alomar
Brady Anderson
Bobby Bonilla
Jeffrey Hammonds
Chris Hoiles
Mike Mussina
Rafael Palmeiro
Cal Ripken Jr.
B. J. Surhoff
Tony Tarasco

Notable transactions
December 21, 1995: Roberto Alomar was signed as a free agent.
December 26, 1995: Traded Curtis Goodwin and Trovin Valdez to Cincinnati Reds for David Wells.
April 19, 1996: Luis Polonia was signed as a free agent with the Baltimore Orioles.
June 6, 1996: Todd Frohwirth was signed as a free agent with the Baltimore Orioles.
August 12, 1996: Luis Polonia was released by the Baltimore Orioles.
August 23, 1996: Gregg Zaun was sent by the Baltimore Orioles to the Florida Marlins to complete an earlier deal made on August 21, 1996. The Baltimore Orioles sent a player to be named later to the Florida Marlins for Terry Mathews. The Baltimore Orioles sent Gregg Zaun (August 23, 1996) to the Florida Marlins to complete the trade.
August 29, 1996: Traded Calvin Maduro and Garrett Stephenson to Philadelphia Phillies for Todd Zeile and Pete Incaviglia.

Season standings

Record vs. opponents

Game log

|- bgcolor="ccffcc"
| 1 || April 2 || Royals || 4–2 || Mussina (1–0) || Appier || Myers (1) || 46,818 || 1–0
|- bgcolor="ccffcc"
| 2 || April 3 || Royals || 7–1 || Wells (1–0) || Gubicza || — || 40,068 || 2–0
|- bgcolor="ccffcc"
| 3 || April 4 || Royals || 5–3 || Rhodes (1–0) || Pichardo || Myers (2) || 38,753 || 3–0
|- bgcolor="ccffcc"
| 4 || April 5 || @ Twins || 2–1 || Mercker (1–0) || Guardado || Myers (3) || 22,744 || 4–0
|- bgcolor="ffbbbb"
| 5 || April 6 || @ Twins || 3–8 || Radke || Haynes (0–1) || — || 22,334 || 4–1
|- bgcolor="ccffcc"
| 6 || April 7 || @ Twins || 4–2 || Mussina (2–0) || Robertson || Myers (4) || 14,580 || 5–1
|- bgcolor="ccffcc"
| 7 || April 10 || Indians || 3–2 (10) || Orosco (1–0) || Tavarez || — || 45,097 || 6–1
|- bgcolor="ccffcc"
| 8 || April 11 || Indians || 14–4 || Erickson (1–0) || Hershiser || Rhodes (1) || 43,189 || 7–1
|- bgcolor="ccffcc"
| 9 || April 12 || Twins || 3–2 || Mussina (3–0) || Robertson || — || 42,602 || 8–1
|- bgcolor="ccffcc"
| 10 || April 13 || Twins || 7–6 || Benitez (1–0) || Mahomes || — || 42,644 || 9–1
|- bgcolor="ffbbbb"
| 11 || April 14 || Twins || 1–4 || Rodriguez || Haynes (0–2) || Stevens || 42,660 || 9–2
|- bgcolor="ccffcc"
| 12 || April 16 || Red Sox || 6–1 || Wells (2–0) || Clemens || — || 40,017 || 10–2
|- bgcolor="ccffcc"
| 13 || April 17 || Red Sox || 6–5 (12) || Rhodes (2–0) || Maddux || — || 40,258 || 11–2
|- bgcolor="ffbbbb"
| 14 || April 18 || Red Sox || 7–10 || Moyer || Mussina (3–1) || Slocumb || 47,283 || 11–3
|- bgcolor="ffbbbb"
| 15 || April 19 || @ Rangers || 7–26 || Cook || Mercker (1–1) || Vosberg || 41,184 || 11–4
|- bgcolor="ffbbbb"
| 16 || April 20 || @ Rangers || 3–8 || Gross || Haynes (0–3) || — || 45,358 || 11–5
|- bgcolor="ffbbbb"
| 17 || April 21 || @ Rangers || 6–9 || Oliver || Wells (2–1) || — || 39,456 || 11–6
|- bgcolor="ffbbbb"
| 18 || April 22 || @ Indians || 3–6 || Nagy || Erickson (1–1) || Mesa || 42,236 || 11–7
|- bgcolor="ffbbbb"
| 19 || April 23 || @ Indians || 8–9 || Ogea || Mussina (3–2) || Mesa || 40,770 || 11–8
|- bgcolor="ccffcc"
| 20 || April 24 || @ Royals || 11–8 || Mercker (2–1) || Haney || — || 13,962 || 12–8
|- bgcolor="ccffcc"
| 21 || April 25 || @ Royals || 3–2 || Rhodes (3–0) || Valera || Myers (5) || 16,090 || 13–8
|- bgcolor="ffbbbb"
| 22 || April 26 || Rangers || 4–5 || Brandenburg || Wells (2–2) || Henneman || 44,022 || 13–9
|- bgcolor="ffbbbb"
| 23 || April 27 || Rangers || 2–4 || Witt || Erickson (1–2) || Vosberg || 47,311 || 13–10
|- bgcolor="ffbbbb"
| 24 || April 28 || Rangers || 4–5 (10) || Heredia || McDowell (0–1) || Henneman || 47,327 || 13–11
|- bgcolor="ccffcc"
| 25 || April 29 || Rangers || 8–7 || Haynes (1–3) || Helling || Myers (6) || 41,503 || 14–11
|- bgcolor="ffbbbb"
| 26 || April 30 || Yankees || 10–13 || Nelson || Shepherd (0–1) || Wetteland || 43,117 || 14–12
|-

|- bgcolor="ffbbbb"
| 27 || May 1 || Yankees || 6–11 (15) || Pettitte || Mercker (2–2) || — || 47,472 || 14–13
|- bgcolor="ccffcc"
| 28 || May 3 || Brewers || 8–2 || Erickson (2–2) || Bones || — || 41,037 || 15–13
|- bgcolor="ccffcc"
| 29 || May 4 || Brewers || 10–5 || Mussina (4–2) || Sparks || — || 44,175 || 16–13
|- bgcolor="ffbbbb"
| 30 || May 5 || Brewers || 1–13 || McDonald || Haynes (1–4) || — || 46,027 || 16–14
|- bgcolor="ffbbbb"
| 31 || May 7 || @ White Sox || 2–3 || Fernandez || Wells (2–3) || Hernandez || 16,130 || 16–15
|- bgcolor="ffbbbb"
| 32 || May 8 || @ White Sox || 2–11 || Baldwin || Erickson (2–3) || — || 14,974 || 16–16
|- bgcolor="ccffcc"
| 33 || May 9 || @ White Sox || 6–4 || Mussina (5–2) || Alvarez || Myers (7) || 14,507 || 17–16
|- bgcolor="ccffcc"
| 34 || May 10 || @ Brewers || 10–7 (12) || Orosco (2–0) || Garcia || McDowell (1) || 9,520 || 18–16
|- bgcolor="ccffcc"
| 35 || May 11 || @ Brewers || 5–3 (10) || Rhodes (4–0) || Potts || Myers (8) || 21,081 || 19–16
|- bgcolor="ffbbbb"
| 36 || May 12 || @ Brewers || 4–6 || Miranda || Erickson (2–4) || Fetters || 14,333 || 19–17
|- bgcolor="ccffcc"
| 37 || May 13 || @ Athletics || 4–3 || Krivda (1–0) || Johns || Myers (9) || 8,204 || 20–17
|- bgcolor="ccffcc"
| 38 || May 14 || @ Athletics || 9–1 || Mussina (6–2) || Reyes || — || 8,466 || 21–17
|- bgcolor="ccffcc"
| 39 || May 17 || Mariners || 14–13 || Mills (1–0) || Charlton || — || 47,259 || 22–17
|- bgcolor="ffbbbb"
| 40 || May 18 || Mariners || 3–7 || Milacki || Mercker (2–3) || — || 46,434 || 22–18
|- bgcolor="ccffcc"
| 41 || May 19 || Mariners || 8–7 || Mussina (7–2) || Hurtado || Myers (10) || 47,565 || 23–18
|- bgcolor="ccffcc"
| 42 || May 20 || Angels || 13–1 || Wells (3–3) || Grimsley || — || 43,492 || 24–18
|- bgcolor="ffbbbb"
| 43 || May 21 || Angels || 2–5 || Boskie || Krivda (1–1) || Percival || 39,974 || 24–19
|- bgcolor="ccffcc"
| 44 || May 22 || Angels || 10–5 || Haynes (2–4) || Abbott || McDowell (2) || 45,817 || 25–19
|- bgcolor="ccffcc"
| 45 || May 24 || Athletics || 5–4 (10) || McDowell (1–1) || Reyes || — || 45,024 || 26–19
|- bgcolor="ffbbbb"
| 46 || May 25 || Athletics || 3–6 || Johns || Wells (3–4) || Groom || 47,353 || 26–20
|- bgcolor="ccffcc"
| 47 || May 26 || Athletics || 6–1 || Mercker (3–3) || Chouinard || McDowell (3) || 47,401 || 27–20
|- bgcolor="ccffcc"
| 48 || May 28 || @ Mariners || 12–8 || Rhodes (5–0) || Guetterman || Haynes (1) || 23,235 || 28–20
|- bgcolor="ffbbbb"
| 49 || May 29 || @ Mariners || 8–9 || Charlton || Myers (0–1) || — || 20,253 || 28–21
|- bgcolor="ffbbbb"
| 50 || May 31 || @ Angels || 3–10 || Langston || Wells (3–5) || — || 21,603 || 28–22
|-

|- bgcolor="ffbbbb"
| 51 || June 1 || @ Angels || 3–8 || Boskie || Haynes (2–5) || — || 35,350 || 28–23
|- bgcolor="ccffcc"
| 52 || June 2 || @ Angels || 14–1 || Erickson (3–4) || Abbott || — || 33,704 || 29–23
|- bgcolor="ccffcc"
| 53 || June 4 || Tigers || 10–7 || Mussina (8–2) || Gohr || Myers (11) || 43,727 || 30–23
|- bgcolor="ccffcc"
| 54 || June 5 || Tigers || 6–4 || Rhodes (6–0) || Myers || Myers (12) || 43,087 || 31–23
|- bgcolor="ccffcc"
| 55 || June 6 || Tigers || 13–6 || Krivda (2–1) || Lira || — || 46,269 || 32–23
|- bgcolor="ffbbbb"
| 56 || June 7 || White Sox || 2–8 || Fernandez || Erickson (3–5) || — || 47,209 || 32–24
|- bgcolor="ffbbbb"
| 57 || June 8 || White Sox || 1–2 || Baldwin || Mercker (3–4) || Hernandez || 47,634 || 32–25
|- bgcolor="ffbbbb"
| 58 || June 9 || White Sox || 9–12 || Karchner || Mussina (8–3) || Hernandez || 47,352 || 32–26
|- bgcolor="ffbbbb"
| 59 || June 10 || @ Tigers || 3–8 || Olivares || Wells (3–6) || — || 10,655 || 32–27
|- bgcolor="ccffcc"
| 60 || June 11 || @ Tigers || 12–9 || Coppinger (1–0) || Lira || — || 10,874 || 33–27
|- bgcolor="ccffcc"
| 61 || June 12 || @ Tigers || 10–7 || Rhodes (7–0) || Lewis || Myers (13) || 12,043 || 34–27
|- bgcolor="ffbbbb"
| 62 || June 13 || @ Royals || 2–10 || Linton || Mercker (3–5) || — || 20,108 || 34–28
|- bgcolor="ccffcc"
| 63 || June 14 || @ Royals || 6–1 || Mussina (9–3) || Gubicza || — || 28,502 || 35–28
|- bgcolor="ffbbbb"
| 64 || June 15 || @ Royals || 6–7 (16) || Magnante || Krivda (2–2) || — || 24,784 || 35–29
|- bgcolor="ccffcc"
| 65 || June 16 || @ Royals || 13–5 || Coppinger (2–0) || Jacome || Mills (1) || 19,437 || 36–29
|- bgcolor="ffffff"
| 66 || June 17 || Rangers || 1–1 (6) ||  ||  || — || 45,581 || 36–29
|- bgcolor="ffbbbb"
| 67 || June 18 || Rangers || 0–7 || Oliver || Mercker (3–6) || — || 47,318 || 36–30
|- bgcolor="ffbbbb"
| 68 || June 19 || Rangers || 2–3 || Witt || Mussina (9–4) || Russell || 45,581 || 36–31
|- bgcolor="ccffcc"
| 69 || June 20 || Rangers || 3–2 || Wells (4–6) || Gross || Myers (14) || 21,748 || 37–31
|- bgcolor="ccffcc"
| 70 || June 21 || Royals || 9–3 || Rhodes (8–0) || Haney || — || 47,644 || 38–31
|- bgcolor="ccffcc"
| 71 || June 22 || Royals || 5–3 || Erickson (4–5) || Montgomery || — || 47,534 || 39–31
|- bgcolor="ffbbbb"
| 72 || June 23 || Royals || 0–4 || Appier || Krivda (2–3) || — || 47,608 || 39–32
|- bgcolor="ccffcc"
| 73 || June 24 || @ Rangers || 8–3 || Mussina (10–4) || Witt || — || 39,701 || 40–32
|- bgcolor="ffbbbb"
| 74 || June 25 || @ Rangers || 2–5 || Gross || Wells (4–7) || Henneman || 41,685 || 40–33
|- bgcolor="ffbbbb"
| 75 || June 26 || @ Rangers || 5–6 || Cook || Orosco (2–1) || Henneman || 38,984 || 40–34
|- bgcolor="ffbbbb"
| 76 || June 27 || @ Yankees || 2–3 || Rogers || Erickson (4–6) || Wetteland || 34,161 || 40–35
|- bgcolor="ccffcc"
| 77 || June 28 || @ Yankees || 7–4 || Rhodes (9–0) || Rivera || Myers (15) || 43,515 || 41–35
|- bgcolor="ffbbbb"
| 78 || June 29 || @ Yankees || 3–4 || Pettitte || Mussina (10–5) || Wetteland || 45,295 || 41–36
|- bgcolor="ccffcc"
| 79 || June 30 || @ Yankees || 9–1 || Wells (5–7) || Mendoza || — || 40,200 || 42–36
|-

|- bgcolor="ccffcc"
| 80 || July 1 || @ Blue Jays || 7–4 || Coppinger (3–0) || Hentgen || Myers (16) || 43,377 || 43–36
|- bgcolor="ccffcc"
| 81 || July 2 || @ Blue Jays || 8–2 || Erickson (5–6) || Quantrill || — || 32,150 || 44–36
|- bgcolor="ffbbbb"
| 82 || July 3 || @ Blue Jays || 2–5 || Guzman || Krivda (2–4) || Timlin || 32,365 || 44–37
|- bgcolor="ccffcc"
| 83 || July 4 || Red Sox || 8–6 || Mussina (11–5) || Wakefield || Myers (17) || 47,075 || 45–37
|- bgcolor="ffbbbb"
| 84 || July 5 || Red Sox || 3–7 || Sele || Wells (5–8) || — || 47,237 || 45–38
|- bgcolor="ccffcc"
| 85 || July 6 || Red Sox || 4–3 || Coppinger (4–0) || Clemens || Myers (18) || 47,500 || 46–38
|- bgcolor="ffbbbb"
| 86 || July 7 || Red Sox || 5–7 || Hudson || Myers (0–2) || Slocumb || 47,532 || 46–39
|- bgcolor="ffbbbb"
| 87 || July 11 || Yankees || 2–4 || Key || Mussina (11–6) || Wetteland || 46,760 || 46–40
|- bgcolor="ffbbbb"
| 88 || July 13 || Yankees || 2–3 || Nelson || Wells (5–9) || Wetteland || — || 46–41
|- bgcolor="ffbbbb"
| 89 || July 13 || Yankees || 5–7 || Gooden || Rhodes (9–1) || Wetteland || 46,451 || 46–42
|- bgcolor="ffbbbb"
| 90 || July 14 || Yankees || 1–4 || Pettitte || Erickson (5–7) || Wetteland || 47,658 || 46–43
|- bgcolor="ccffcc"
| 91 || July 15 || Blue Jays || 8–6 || Haynes (3–5) || Timlin || — || 43,192 || 47–43
|- bgcolor="ffbbbb"
| 92 || July 16 || Blue Jays || 0–6 || Guzman || Mussina (11–7) || — || 45,851 || 47–44
|- bgcolor="ccffcc"
| 93 || July 17 || Blue Jays || 11–10 || Coppinger (5–0) || Timlin || — || 45,955 || 48–44
|- bgcolor="ccffcc"
| 94 || July 18 || @ Red Sox || 6–3 || Wells (6–9) || Sele || Myers (19) || 33,014 || 49–44
|- bgcolor="ffbbbb"
| 95 || July 19 || @ Red Sox || 2–13 || Moyer || Erickson (5–8) || — || 32,262 || 49–45
|- bgcolor="ffbbbb"
| 96 || July 20 || @ Red Sox || 0–2 || Wakefield || Coppinger (5–1) || Slocumb || 33,590 || 49–46
|- bgcolor="ccffcc"
| 97 || July 21 || @ Red Sox || 10–6 (10) || Myers (1–2) || Stanton || — || 34,423 || 50–46
|- bgcolor="ffbbbb"
| 98 || July 22 || Twins || 5–9 || Robertson || Haynes (3–6) || Trombley || 42,129 || 50–47
|- bgcolor="ffbbbb"
| 99 || July 23 || Twins || 2–3 || Aguilera || Wells (6–10) || Naulty || 42,006 || 50–48
|- bgcolor="ffbbbb"
| 100 || July 24 || Twins || 4–11 || Rodriguez || Erickson (5–9) || — || 46,181 || 50–49
|- bgcolor="ffbbbb"
| 101 || July 25 || Indians || 7–10 || Nagy || Coppinger (5–2) || — || 47,025 || 50–50
|- bgcolor="ffbbbb"
| 102 || July 26 || Indians || 9–14 || Assenmacher || Mussina (11–8) || — || 46,751 || 50–51
|- bgcolor="ccffcc"
| 103 || July 27 || Indians || 14–2 || Wells (7–10) || Hershiser || — || 47,360 || 51–51
|- bgcolor="ffbbbb"
| 104 || July 28 || Indians || 3–6 (13) || Mesa || Stephenson (0–1) || — || 46,273 || 51–52
|- bgcolor="ccffcc"
| 105 || July 30 || @ Twins || 16–4 || Coppinger (6–2) || Rodriguez || — || 16,708 || 52–52
|- bgcolor="ccffcc"
| 106 || July 31 || @ Twins || 9–3 || Mussina (12–8) || Trombley || — || 15,897 || 53–52
|-

|- bgcolor="ccffcc"
| 107 || August 1 || @ Twins || 4–2 || Wells (8–10) || Robertson || Myers (20) || 20,379 || 54–52
|- bgcolor="ffbbbb"
| 108 || August 2 || @ Indians || 1–11 || Hershiser || Erickson (5–10) || — || 42,465 || 54–53
|- bgcolor="ccffcc"
| 109 || August 3 || @ Indians || 9–4 || Orosco (3–1) || Ogea || — || 42,448 || 55–53
|- bgcolor="ffbbbb"
| 110 || August 4 || @ Indians || 2–14 || Anderson || Coppinger (6–3) || — || 42,349 || 55–54
|- bgcolor="ccffcc"
| 111 || August 5 || @ Indians || 13–10 || Wells (9–10) || Assenmacher || — || 40,863 || 56–54
|- bgcolor="ccffcc"
| 112 || August 6 || @ Brewers || 13–3 || Mussina (13–8) || McDonald || — || 17,075 || 57–54
|- bgcolor="ccffcc"
| 113 || August 7 || @ Brewers || 12–2 || Erickson (6–10) || Karl || — || 20,287 || 58–54
|- bgcolor="ccffcc"
| 114 || August 8 || @ Brewers || 6–4 || Coppinger (7–3) || D'Amico || Myers (21) || 18,620 || 59–54
|- bgcolor="ffbbbb"
| 115 || August 9 || @ White Sox || 3–4 (10) || Simas || Myers (1–3) || — || 23,995 || 59–55
|- bgcolor="ccffcc"
| 116 || August 10 || @ White Sox || 13–4 || Mussina (14–8) || Alvarez || McDowell (4) || 26,772 || 60–55
|- bgcolor="ffbbbb"
| 117 || August 11 || @ White Sox || 5–8 || Tapani || Mills (1–1) || Hernandez || 27,088 || 60–56
|- bgcolor="ccffcc"
| 118 || August 13 || Brewers || 4–3 || Corbin (1–0) || Lloyd || Myers (22) || 44,461 || 61–56
|- bgcolor="ccffcc"
| 119 || August 14 || Brewers || 8–5 || Milchin (1–0) || Bones || Myers (23) || 47,480 || 62–56
|- bgcolor="ccffcc"
| 120 || August 15 || @ Athletics || 18–5 || Mussina (15–8) || Adams || — || 14,026 || 63–56
|- bgcolor="ccffcc"
| 121 || August 16 || @ Athletics || 14–3 || Erickson (7–10) || Wasdin || — || — || 64–56
|- bgcolor="ccffcc"
| 122 || August 16 || @ Athletics || 5–4 (10) || Myers (2–3) || Mohler || — || 15,645 || 65–56
|- bgcolor="ffbbbb"
| 123 || August 17 || @ Athletics || 1–3 || Prieto || Coppinger (7–4) || Acre || 20,231 || 65–57
|- bgcolor="ffbbbb"
| 124 || August 18 || @ Athletics || 6–9 || Wengert || Wells (9–11) || — || 18,122 || 65–58
|- bgcolor="ccffcc"
| 125 || August 20 || Mariners || 4–1 || Mussina (16–8) || Wagner || Myers (24) || 47,679 || 66–58
|- bgcolor="ccffcc"
| 126 || August 21 || Mariners || 10–5 || Erickson (8–10) || Hitchcock || — || 47,198 || 67–58
|- bgcolor="ffbbbb"
| 127 || August 22 || Mariners || 3–10 || Moyer || Coppinger (7–5) || — || 47,380 || 67–59
|- bgcolor="ffbbbb"
| 128 || August 23 || Angels || 0–2 || Boskie || Wells (9–12) || Percival || 47,291 || 67–60
|- bgcolor="ccffcc"
| 129 || August 24 || Angels || 5–4 || Mussina (17–8) || Abbott || Myers (25) || 46,487 || 68–60
|- bgcolor="ffbbbb"
| 130 || August 25 || Angels || 0–13 || Springer || Erickson (8–11) || — || 47,239 || 68–61
|- bgcolor="ccffcc"
| 131 || August 26 || Athletics || 12–11 (10) || Myers (3–3) || Acre || — || 43,361 || 69–61
|- bgcolor="ccffcc"
| 132 || August 27 || Athletics || 3–1 || Wells (10–12) || Prieto || Myers (26) || 43,641 || 70–61
|- bgcolor="ffbbbb"
| 133 || August 28 || Athletics || 0–3 || Wengert || Mussina (17–9) || — || 45,282 || 70–62
|- bgcolor="ffbbbb"
| 134 || August 29 || @ Mariners || 6–9 || Charlton || Myers (3–4) || — || 24,915 || 70–63
|- bgcolor="ccffcc"
| 135 || August 30 || @ Mariners || 5–2 || Coppinger (8–5) || Hitchcock || Mills (2) || 44,532 || 71–63
|- bgcolor="ccffcc"
| 136 || August 31 || @ Mariners || 7–6 || Erickson (9–11) || Bosio || Benitez (1) || 42,092 || 72–63
|-

|- bgcolor="ffbbbb"
| 137 || September 1 || @ Mariners || 1–5 || Mulholland || Wells (10–13) || — || 50,015 || 72–64
|- bgcolor="ccffcc"
| 138 || September 2 || @ Angels || 12–8 || Mussina (18–9) || Boskie || — || 20,287 || 73–64
|- bgcolor="ffbbbb"
| 139 || September 3 || @ Angels || 2–10 || Harris || Coppinger (8–6) || — || 15,924 || 73–65
|- bgcolor="ccffcc"
| 140 || September 4 || @ Angels || 4–2 || Erickson (10–11) || Springer || Myers (27) || 18,204 || 74–65
|- bgcolor="ffbbbb"
| 141 || September 6 || Tigers || 4–5 (12) || Cummings || Mathews (0–1) || — || 46,708 || 74–66
|- bgcolor="ccffcc"
| 142 || September 7 || Tigers || 6–0 || Mussina (19–9) || Thompson || — || 47,131 || 75–66
|- bgcolor="ccffcc"
| 143 || September 8 || Tigers || 6–2 || Mills (2–1) || Eischen || — || 47,082 || 76–66
|- bgcolor="ccffcc"
| 144 || September 9 || Tigers || 5–4 || Erickson (11–11) || Olivares || Myers (28) || 42,562 || 77–66
|- bgcolor="ccffcc"
| 145 || September 10 || White Sox || 5–1 || Wells (11–13) || Tapani || — || 43,320 || 78–66
|- bgcolor="ccffcc"
| 146 || September 11 || White Sox || 7–6 (10) || Mills (3–1) || Hernandez || — || 43,320 || 79–66
|- bgcolor="ffbbbb"
| 147 || September 12 || White Sox || 3–11 || Fernandez || Mussina (19–10) || — || 47,342 || 79–67
|- bgcolor="ccffcc"
| 148 || September 13 || @ Tigers || 7–4 || Erickson (12–11) || Miller || Mills (3) || 11,178 || 80–67
|- bgcolor="ccffcc"
| 149 || September 14 || @ Tigers || 7–6 || Mathews (1–1) || Cummings || Myers (29) || 15,386 || 81–67
|- bgcolor="ccffcc"
| 150 || September 15 || @ Tigers || 16–6 || Corbin (2–0) || Van Poppel || — || 13,764 || 82–67
|- bgcolor="ffbbbb"
| 151 || September 18 || @ Yankees || 2–3 (10) || Rivera || Mills (3–2) || — || 40,775 || 82–68
|- bgcolor="ffbbbb"
| 152 || September 19 || @ Yankees || 3–9 || Rogers || Mussina (19–11) || — || — || 82–69
|- bgcolor="ccffcc"
| 153 || September 19 || @ Yankees || 10–9 || Mathews (2–1) || Rivera || Myers (30) || 54,888 || 83–69
|- bgcolor="ffbbbb"
| 154 || September 20 || Blue Jays || 1–5 || Hentgen || Krivda (2–5) || Spoljaric || 47,026 || 83–70
|- bgcolor="ccffcc"
| 155 || September 21 || Blue Jays || 6–3 || Coppinger (9–6) || Williams || Myers (31) || 47,270 || 84–70
|- bgcolor="ccffcc"
| 156 || September 22 || Blue Jays || 5–4 || Erickson (13–11) || Flener || Benitez (2) || 46,035 || 85–70
|- bgcolor="ffbbbb"
| 157 || September 23 || Brewers || 7–8 (10) || Jones || Mathews (2–2) || Fetters || 46,542 || 85–71
|- bgcolor="ffbbbb"
| 158 || September 24 || @ Red Sox || 8–13 || Gordon || Wells (11–14) || Mahomes || 28,557 || 85–72
|- bgcolor="ccffcc"
| 159 || September 25 || @ Red Sox || 6–2 || Krivda (3–5) || Wakefield || Benitez (3) || 28,432 || 86–72
|- bgcolor="ccffcc"
| 160 || September 26 || @ Blue Jays || 4–1 || Coppinger (10–6) || Williams || Benitez (4) || 30,141 || 87–72
|- bgcolor="ffbbbb"
| 161 || September 27 || @ Blue Jays || 2–3 || Flener || Erickson (13–12) || Timlin || 30,116 || 87–73
|- bgcolor="ccffcc"
| 162 || September 28 || @ Blue Jays || 3–2 (10) || Myers (4–4) || Spoljaric || — || 36,316 || 88–73
|- bgcolor="ffbbbb"
| 163 || September 29 || @ Blue Jays || 1–4 || Hentgen || Rodriguez (0–1) || Timlin || 38,267 || 88–74
|-

|-
| Legend:       = Win       = Loss       = TieBold = Orioles team member

Detailed records

Roster

Player stats

Batting
Note: G = Pos = Position; Games played; AB = At bats; H = Hits; HR = Home runs; RBI = Runs batted in; Avg. = Batting average

Other batters
Note: G = Games played; AB = At bats; H = Hits; HR = Home runs; RBI = Runs batted in; Avg. = Batting average

Pitching

Return of Eddie Murray
On July 21, 1996, the Baltimore Orioles re-acquired longtime Oriole Eddie Murray from the Cleveland Indians in exchange for pitcher Kent Mercker. Murray, a member of the 1983 World Series Champion Baltimore Orioles, would subsequently hit his 500th career home run later in the season. As a commemoration of this event, an orange seat was installed in the outfield stands where Murray's 500th home run landed.  The Orioles had a record of 49 wins and 46 losses before the trade, and 39–28 after the trade, not including the playoffs.  During the 1996 playoffs, Eddie Murray hit .333 and hit a home run while producing 3 RBI.

The trade for Eddie Murray sparked the Orioles to have a better record after his arrival, than before.  One can attribute that to his great leadership, which is well documented, as a Sporting News correspondent,  Michael P. Geffner said, "To think of Murray as anything other than a great player these days is not to have a dissenting opinion anymore but to be dead wrong, blind not only to the inner game but to an understanding of what truly raises baseball to something classic and beautiful--when the game is executed purely and seamlessly. Which is Eddie Murray to a T.".  The Orioles success after the trade can also be attributed to the theory of "Power, worth, and recognition, " which Thomas S. Parish who is an associate professor of psychology at Upper Iowa University, Fayette, Iowa, describes as a type of motivation where athletes attempt to out do or "show off" to each other, which leads to better statistics, and more wins. In Eddie Murray's last at-bat with the Orioles he hit a home run off of New York Yankee pitcher, Andy Pettitte.

ALDS

Game 1, October 1

Oriole Park at Camden Yards, Baltimore, Maryland

Game 2, October 2
Oriole Park at Camden Yards, Baltimore, Maryland

Game 3, October 4
Jacobs Field, Cleveland, Ohio

Game 4, October 5
Jacobs Field, Cleveland, Ohio

ALCS

Jeffrey Maier incident
During Game 1 of the ALCS, New York Yankees shortstop Derek Jeter hit a deep fly ball to right field. Orioles outfielder Tony Tarasco camped under the ball and prepared to make a catch. However, a 12-year-old boy seated in the first row of the bleachers named Jeffrey Maier reached over the wall and caught the ball just above Tarrasco, costing the Orioles an out. Although it was fan interference, the umpire ruled the ball to be a home run. While Maier became a hero to Yankees fans, he immediately became a "symbol of the Orioles futility." The Orioles would go on to lose the series in five games.

Farm system

References

External links
1996 Baltimore Orioles team at Baseball-Reference
1996 Baltimore Orioles season at baseball-almanac.com

Baltimore Orioles seasons
Baltimore
Baltimore Orioles